Palaeomolis is a genus of moths in the subfamily Arctiinae. The genus was erected by George Hampson in 1909.

Species
Palaeomolis garleppi Rothschild, 1910
Palaeomolis hampsoni Rothschild, 1910
Palaeomolis lemairei Toulgoët, 1984
Palaeomolis metacauta Dognin, 1910
Palaeomolis metarhoda (Dognin, 1910)
Palaeomolis palmeri (Rothschild, 1910)
Palaeomolis purpurascens Hampson, 1909
Palaeomolis rothschildi (Dognin, 1911)
Palaeomolis rubescens Toulgoët, 1983

References

Arctiini
Moth genera